Chokosi may refer to:
Chakosi people
Chakosi language